Akalangalil Abhayam is a 1980 Indian Malayalam film, directed by Jeassy and produced by Joy Kuriakose and C. Chacko. The film stars Madhu, Sheela, Sharada, MG Soman and Sukumaran in the lead roles. The film has musical score by G. Devarajan.

Cast
 
Madhu as Raghuraman 
Sheela as Savithri
Sharada  as Bharghavi aka Ammini
Sukumaran as Unni 
Ambika as Yamuna
M. G. Soman as Balachandran 
Sukumari as 
Manavalan Joseph as Apeksha Velu
Sankaradi as Panikkar
Justin
Mala Aravindan as Sakshi Mathai
Sadhana 
Veeran

Soundtrack
The music was composed by G. Devarajan and the lyrics were written by R. K. Damodaran.

References

External links
 

1980 films
1980s Malayalam-language films